The Challenger La Serena was a professional tennis tournament played on outdoor red clay courts. It is part of the Association of Tennis Professionals (ATP) Challenger Tour. It was held three times in La Serena, Chile, in 2005, 2007 and 2008.

Past finals

Singles

Doubles

External links
Official website 

ATP Challenger Tour
Clay court tennis tournaments
Tennis tournaments in Chile
Recurring sporting events established in 2005
La Serena, Chile
Recurring sporting events disestablished in 2008
2005 establishments in Chile
2008 disestablishments in Chile